The Falkland Islands general election of 2021 was held on Thursday 4 November 2021 to elect all eight members of the Legislative Assembly (five from the Stanley constituency and three from the Camp constituency) through universal suffrage using block voting, with the Chief Executive of the Falkland Islands acting as returning officer. It was the fourth election since the new Constitution came into force replacing the Legislative Council (which had existed since 1845) with the Legislative Assembly.

Timing and procedure
Under the Constitution of the Falkland Islands, the Legislative Assembly must be dissolved four years after the first meeting of the Legislative Assembly following the last election (unless the Executive Council advises the Governor to dissolve the Legislative Assembly sooner). An election must then take place within 70 days of the dissolution.

As first meeting of the current Legislative Assembly took place on 13 November 2017, the Legislative Assembly must be dissolved by midnight on 12 November 2021 and an election must take place before 21 January 2022. However, on 25 August 2021, the Executive Council announced that an early general election would take place on 4 November 2021.

Results 
Incumbent members are in italics.

Stanley constituency

Camp constituency

References

2021 elections in British Overseas Territories
Falkland Islands
General election
2021
Non-partisan elections
November 2021 events in South America